Maaike is a Dutch-language feminine given name, originally a diminutive of the name Maria. Notable people with the name include:

 Maaike Aarts (born 1976), Dutch violinist
 Maaike Caelers (born 1990), Dutch triathlete
 Maaike Polspoel (born 1989), Belgian cyclist
 Maaike Schoorel (born 1973), Dutch artist
 Maaike Schroeder (born 1971), Dutch cricketer
 Maaike Smit (born 1966), Dutch wheelchair athlete
 Maaike Vos (born 1985), Dutch speed skater
 Maaike Petrie Faulstich (born 1977), Dutch Geologist

Dutch feminine given names